Kolbrún Ýr Kristjánsdóttir (born November 11, 1982 in Akranes) is a retired Icelandic swimmer, who specialized in backstroke and butterfly events. She is a two-time Olympian (2000 and 2004), and former Icelandic record holder in the same strokes (both 100 and 200 m).

Kolbrún made her first Icelandic team, as a 17-year-old teen, at the 2000 Summer Olympics in Sydney. There, she failed to reach the semifinals in any of her individual events, finishing forty-third in the 100 m backstroke (1:07.28), and thirty-second in the 200 m backstroke (2:24.33).

At the 2004 Summer Olympics in Athens, Kolbrún shortened her program on her second Olympic appearance, swimming only in the 100 m butterfly. She posted a FINA B-standard entry time of 1:02.07 from the Games of the Small States of Europe in Valletta, Malta. She challenged seven other swimmers in heat two, including five-time Olympian Mette Jacobsen of Denmark. She edged out Hong Kong's Sze Hang Yu to pick up a sixth seed by 0.09 of a second in 1:02.33. Kolbrún failed to advance into the semifinals, as she placed thirty-first overall on the first day of preliminaries.

References

1982 births
Living people
Icelandic female butterfly swimmers
Olympic swimmers of Iceland
Swimmers at the 2000 Summer Olympics
Swimmers at the 2004 Summer Olympics
Icelandic female backstroke swimmers
People from Akranes